Shon Robert Hopwood (born June 11, 1975) is an American appellate lawyer and professor of law at Georgetown University Law Center. Hopwood became well-known as a jailhouse lawyer who served time in prison for bank robbery. While in prison, he started spending time in the law library, and became an accomplished United States Supreme Court practitioner by the time he left in 2009.

Early life
Hopwood is the son of Robert Mark Hopwood and Becky Richards, who raised him in a Christian home. He grew up in David City, Nebraska, approximately an hour's drive northwest of Lincoln, Nebraska. Hopwood is the eldest of five siblings. Hopwood excelled on standardized tests. He was a high school basketball standout, earning himself a scholarship to Midland University in Fremont, Nebraska. After Hopwood realized he was a mediocre talent in basketball, he became disillusioned and did not go to classes.

After leaving school, Hopwood joined the United States Navy. He was stationed in the Persian Gulf. While in the Navy, Hopwood guarded warships with shoulder-mounted Stinger missiles. He almost died from acute pancreatitis in a Bahrain hospital, which prompted his discharge from the Navy.

Bank robbery
Hopwood pleaded guilty on October 28, 1998, to robbing several banks in Nebraska. Federal judge Richard G. Kopf of the U.S. District Court for the District of Nebraska sentenced Hopwood to 12 years and three months in prison, followed by three years of supervised release and ordered $134,544 in restitution. Kopf was stunned by Hopwood's later transformation, saying, "my gut told me that [he] was a punk—all mouth, and very little else. My viscera was wrong." In Kopf's own opinion, "Hopwood proves that my sentencing instincts suck."

Jailhouse lawyer
Hopwood served his prison sentence at Federal Correctional Institution, Pekin. While at Pekin, he spent five weeks in solitary confinement, and criticized the practice once he got out.

He prepared his first petition for certiorari for a fellow inmate on a prison typewriter in 2002. Since Hopwood was not a lawyer, the only name on the brief was that of the other prisoner, John Fellers. Once the Supreme Court agreed to hear the case, he worked with former United States Solicitor General Seth Waxman in preparing the case. Waxman stated that the petition for writ of certiorari was probably one of the best he had ever seen. The court agreed to hear the case, Fellers v. United States. The court, in a 9–0 decision, found that police had acted unconstitutionally in questioning Fellers, who had been convicted of a drug conspiracy. Fellers's sentence was ultimately reduced by four years.

In 2005, the Supreme Court granted a second cert petition prepared by Hopwood, vacating a lower court decision and sending the case back for a fresh look. Hopwood has also helped inmates from Indiana, Michigan and Nebraska get sentence reductions of 3 to 10 years from lower courts.

He also won honorable mention in the PEN American Center 2008 Prison Writing contest.

Hopwood was released from the custody of the Bureau of Prisons on April 9, 2009. In 2010, he was working at Cockle Printing in Omaha, Nebraska, a leading printer of Supreme Court briefs.

Law school and legal career
Hopwood holds a Bachelor of Science from Bellevue University in Bellevue, Nebraska, and a Juris Doctor from the University of Washington School of Law, where he was a Gates Public Service Law Scholar.  He accepted an offer to spend a year working as a law clerk for Judge Janice Rogers Brown of the United States Court of Appeals for the District of Columbia Circuit after he graduated from law school.

On September 4, 2014, the Supreme Court of Washington approved the recommendation made by the Character and Fitness Committee of the Washington State Bar Association, permitting Hopwood to take the Washington bar examination, and to become an attorney if he passed. His ability to become of a member of the Washington State Bar Association was named one of the National Law Journals 14 memorable Supreme Court of the United States stories of 2014. In 2015, Hopwood became a licensed lawyer in the state of Washington.

In 2015, Hopwood accepted a position as a graduate teaching fellow in Georgetown University Law Center's Appellate Litigation Clinic, where he was pursuing a Master of Laws degree. In 2017, Hopwood became a professor of law at Georgetown.  He hired 2020 Georgetown Law graduate Tiffany Trump as his research assistant.

Writings and views
Hopwood's memoir, Law Man: My Story of Robbing Banks, Winning Supreme Court Cases, and Finding Redemption, co-written with Dennis Burke, was published in August 2012. In the memoir, Hopwood details both his life as a jailhouse lawyer and his romance with his wife, Ann Marie Hopwood, to whom Hopwood wrote during eight years of his imprisonment. Law Man received critical acclaim from a number of book reviewers.

Hopwood is a criminal justice advocate, and he has written about the need for federal sentencing and prison reform. Hopwood told an ACLU event that his home state of Nebraska should reform sentencing guidelines for prisoners, keep good time credits and not build a new prison.

Contributions to scholarly journals
 Clarity in Criminal Law, American Criminal Law Review (2016)
 Seasonal Affective Disorder: Clerk Training and the Success of Supreme Court Certiorari Petitions
 The Not So Speedy Trial Act, 89 Wash. L. Rev. 709 (2014)
 Preface: Failing to Fix Sentencing Mistakes: How the System of Mass Incarceration May Have Hardened the Hearts of the Federal Judiciary, 43 Geo. L.J. Ann. Rev. Crim. Proc. iii (2014)
 Slicing Through the Great Legal Gordian Knot: Ways to Assist Pro Se Litigants in Their Quest for Justice, 80 Fordham L. Rev. 1229 (2011) 
 A Sunny Deposition: How the in Forma Pauperis Statute Provides an Avenue for Indigent Prisoners to Seek Depositions Without Accompanying Fees, 46 Harv. C.R.-C.L. L. Rev. 195 (2011)
 From a Prison Law Library to the New York Times, Informal Opinion, Champion, November 2010

In the media
Hopwood has been profiled by The New York Times, NPR, and other media. He was featured on a 60 Minutes segment in 2017 and repeated in 2019, where he was interviewed by Steve Kroft.

References

21st-century American essayists
American bank robbers
American bloggers
Living people
American legal scholars
American legal writers
21st-century American memoirists
Prison reformers
Lawyers from Washington, D.C.
Criminal defense lawyers
Public defenders
Writers from Washington, D.C.
Writers from Nebraska
University of Washington School of Law alumni
Washington (state) lawyers
People from David City, Nebraska
Bellevue University alumni
American male essayists
Georgetown University Law Center faculty
American male bloggers
1975 births